Tim Golden may refer to:
 Tim Golden (politician), Republican member of the Georgia State Senate
 Tim Golden (journalist), investigative journalist
 Tim Golden (American football) (born 1959), former American football player